She Was Only a Village Maiden is a 1933 British comedy film directed by Arthur Maude and starring Anne Grey, Lester Matthews and Carl Harbord. It was made at Shepperton Studios as a quota quickie.

Cast
 Anne Grey as Priscilla Protheroe 
 Lester Matthews as Frampton  
 Carl Harbord as Peter  
 Barbara Everest as Agatha  
 Julian Royce as Duke of Buckfast  
 Anthony Holles as Vicar  
 Gertrude Sterroll as Lady Lodden  
 Daphne Scorer as Emily  
 Ella Daincourt as Mrs. Cruickshank

References

Bibliography
 Chibnall, Steve. Quota Quickies: The Birth of the British 'B' Film. British Film Institute, 2007.
 Low, Rachael. Filmmaking in 1930s Britain. George Allen & Unwin, 1985.
 Wood, Linda. British Films, 1927-1939. British Film Institute, 1986.

External links
 

1933 films
British comedy films
1933 comedy films
Films shot at Shepperton Studios
Quota quickies
Films directed by Arthur Maude
British black-and-white films
1930s English-language films
1930s British films